Curado is a typical Mexican drink, prepared with pulque and fruit, to which a sweetener such as honey or sugar is added.  

The preparation consists of crushing selected fruit and boiling it with little water and sugar or honey until it has a thick consistency, let this preparation cool, mix it with pulque, stir it with a spoon until everything is incorporated, and cool it.

Curado most traditional recipes are those of pulque with red tunas, strawberry, walnut, guava, and some with chocolate or chili. Currently, its preparation includes other types of fruits such as kiwi and piñón.

Sources 
Receta para curar el pulque
Pulque 

Mexican alcoholic drinks